Institute for Revenge is a 1979 American made-for-television drama film starring Sam Groom, Lauren Hutton and George Hamilton.

Cast
Sam Groom - John Schroeder 
Lauren Hutton - Lilla Simms 
George Hamilton - Alan Roberto 
Leslie Nielsen - Hollis Barnes 
Ray Walston - Frank Anders 
Robert Coote - Wellington 
Lane Binkley - Joanne Newcomb 
T.J. McCavitt - T.J. Bradley 
Murray Salem - Sam 
Robert Emhardt - Senator

External links

1979 television films
1979 films
1979 drama films
Films shot in California
American drama films
Films directed by Ken Annakin
Films scored by Lalo Schifrin
1970s English-language films
1970s American films